Sherzod Iskanderovich Yusupov (Russian: Шерзод Искандарович Юсупов) (born in 1981, Urgench, Uzbek SSR) is an Uzbek-born Russian businessman and banker.

Education 
Sherzod Yusupov earned his diploma in Business and Finance from the Calderdale College in the UK. He also holds an MBA from the EAE Business School in Barcelona, Spain.

Career 

Yusupov is a shareholder and member of the board of directors of Russian Vostochny Bank and Modulbank.

The Charitable Fund Sakhovat was founded by Sherzod Yusupov and Sabir Shodiev, son of billionaire Kazakh businessman Patokh Chodiev, with the aim of supporting Uzbek migrants in Russia.

References 

1981 births
Living people
Russian bankers
People from Xorazm Region
Russian businesspeople in the United Kingdom